Charles Edward Camidge (1838–1911) was the 2nd Anglican Bishop of Bathurst. Born into a clerical family he was educated at Wadham College, Oxford. Ordained Deacon in  1860 and Priest a year later his first post was a Sheffield Curacy. Successively the Incumbent at Hedon then Wheldrake he became Rural Dean of Thirsk in 1883. Four years later he was elevated to the Colonial Episcopate and  enthroned on 3 January 1888. “A man held in high esteem by clergy and lay people alike” he died in post.

Further reading

Notes

1838 births
Alumni of Wadham College, Oxford
Anglican bishops of Bathurst
1911 deaths